Suplatast tosilate (INN) is a Th2 cytokine inhibitor which is used as an antihistamine. It has been suggested and applied in the treatment of Kimura's disease a few times.

References

Further reading

Sulfonium compounds
Anilides